Anatoly Nikontsev (born June 25, 1990) is a Russian professional ice hockey winger who currently plays for Metallurg Magnitogorsk of the Kontinental Hockey League (KHL). In 2010, he won the Cherepanov Memorial Trophy, awarded to the rookie of the year in the KHL.

References

External links

1990 births
Living people
Avtomobilist Yekaterinburg players
Metallurg Magnitogorsk players
Russian ice hockey right wingers
Severstal Cherepovets players
HC Spartak Moscow players